The Love Songs is the third major greatest hits album, released in February 2014, following Unbreakable: The Greatest Hits Volume 1 (2002) and Greatest Hits (2011).

Track listing

Charts

References

Westlife albums
2014 greatest hits albums
Sony Music compilation albums